The Caspar C 36 was an aircraft developed in Germany for aerial reconnaissance in the late 1920s.

Design and development
The C 36 was a single-bay biplane with staggered, equal-span wings and a  BMW VI engine. The C 36 was tested in landplane and seaplane forms, but failed to win orders; the sole C 36 (civil registration D-1316) was given to RDL Erprobungsstelle in June 1929, before being decommissioned in early 1932.

Variants
C 36 landplane form with conventional tailskid undercarriage.
C 36W floatplane form with two large strut mounted floats.

Specifications (C 36W)

References

Further reading
 

1920s German military reconnaissance aircraft
C036
Biplanes
Single-engined tractor aircraft
Aircraft first flown in 1928